Scarsdale Golf Club is a private golf club located in Hartsdale, New York.

History
The club contains the Scarsdale Golf Course, founded in 1898, which was designed by famed golf course architect A. W. Tillinghast. Additionally, the club grounds encompass six har-tru tennis courts, an Olympic-size pool, a small pool, four platform tennis courts, a clubhouse, six bowling lanes, and many other structures along the property. Jack Dowling was serving as the club's head professional in 1918.

The clubhouse, built in 1921, was renovated in 2004.  When the club was formed on May 31, 1898, the goal was to attract more people (and golfers) to the Scarsdale area and to provide additional recreational activities for families that resided nearby.

Red Cross 4-ball match
Scarsdale club professional Jack Dowling, who was paired with Tom McNamara in a match held on 15 September 1918 at Scarsdale Golf Club, defeated Chick Evans (national amateur and open champion), and Bobby Jones, in a Red Cross four-ball match on the links of the Scarsdale Golf Club by the score of 1 up. The proceeds from the match were donated to the Red Cross for its war-time efforts during World War I. Dowling took full advantage in winning the match since the event was contested on his home course.

Scorecard

References

Golf clubs and courses in New York (state)
Golf clubs and courses designed by A. W. Tillinghast
Sports venues in Westchester County, New York
1898 establishments in New York (state)